Derrick Williams may refer to: ( Afro American national born 1969)

Derrick Williams (American football) (born 1986), American football wide receiver
Derrick Williams (basketball) (born 1991), American basketball forward
Derrick Williams (footballer) (born 1993), German-born Irish association footballer
Derrick Williams (hurdler) (born 1982), American track and field athlete

See also 

 Derek Williams (disambiguation)